Mark Scott may refer to:

Entertainment
Mark Scott (actor) (1915–1960), American actor and host of the television series Home Run Derby
Mark Scott (radio host) (1936–2005), American talk show host
Mark Scott (singer), lead singer of The Miracles
Mark Scott, also known as SHY, part of the Scottish rapper and songwriter duo SHY & DRS

Sports
Mark Scott (cricketer) (born 1959), English cricketer
Mark Scott (footballer) (born 1959), Australian rules footballer
Mark Scott (rower) (1923–2013), British rower

Others
Mark Scott (businessman) (born 1962), vice-chancellor of the University of Sydney and former managing director of the Australian Broadcasting Corporation
Mark Scott (police officer), Australian Federal police officer killed in the Garuda plane crash
Mark Scott, victim of serial killers Dean Corll and Elmer Wayne Henley

See also
Marc Scott (born 1993), British long-distance runner